The Tamá Massif is a group of mountains on the border between Colombia and Venezuela to the south of Lake Maracaibo. 
It contains evergreen rainforest and cloud forest at the lower levels, and páramos (high moors) at the highest levels.

Location

The Tamá is a prolongation of the Cordillera Oriental of the Colombian Andes.
It is separated from the Cordillera de Mérida in the Venezuelan Andes by the Táchira depression, which more than 50 million years ago was a strait that connected Lake Maracaibo with the Orinoco basin.
The Tamá National Natural Park in Colombia and the El Tamá National Park in Venezuela protect parts of the Tamá Massif.

Geography

The Tamá massif is a set of folded mountain ranges with extremely steep topography.
The mountains are mainly of limestone or sandstone rock, typical of the Guiana Shield.
The Tamá National Natural Park contains an  waterfall one of the world's highest.
The páramos give rise to rivers such as the Carapo, Chiquito, Quinimarí, Quite, Burguita, Burga, Nula, Nulital, Sarare, Cutufí, Oirá, Frío and Negro, which drain into the Orinoco basin or into Lake Maracaibo.
The Táchira River, which drains into Lake Maracaibo, forms part of the border between Colombia and Venezuela.

Environment

Tamá has four types of natural environments: tropical rainforest, sub-Andean forest, Andean forest and páramo.
The forests are included in the Venezuelan Andes montane forests ecoregion, which also covers the Venezuelan Andean cordillera.
There is a well-developed understory and many epiphytes.
Forest species include the colorful Lagenanthus princeps.
In the páramos the plant species are of the genera Jamesonia, Oreobulus, Castilleja, Gentiana, Halenia, Pinguicula, Utricularia, Castratella and Vaccinium.

Mammals include the spectacled bear (Tremarctos ornatus), tapir, lowland paca (Cuniculus paca), anteater and ocelot (Leopardus pardalis).
The endemic wood sprite gracile opossum (Gracilinanus dryas) and Luis Manuel's tailless bat (Anoura luismanueli) are found in both the Andean Cordillera and the Tamá Massif.
Restricted range bird species in the Tamá massif include Táchira antpitta (Grallaria chthonia), hooded antpitta (Grallaricula cucullata) and Venezuelan wood quail (Odontophorus columbianus).
Tamá harlequin frog and Helena's marsupial frog are endemic to the Páramo de Tamá.

Notes

Sources

Mountain ranges of the Andes
Mountain ranges of Venezuela
Mountain ranges of Colombia